Michaux State Forest is a Pennsylvania State Forest in Pennsylvania Bureau of Forestry District #1.  The main offices are located in Fayetteville in Franklin County, Pennsylvania, USA.

The Michaux State Forest is in several tracts covering more than  located in Adams County, southern Cumberland County, eastern Franklin County, and northwestern York County.

History

Michaux State Forest is named for André Michaux, a French botanist.  He was dispatched in 1785 by King Louis XVI of France and his Queen Marie Antoinette to gather plants for the Royal Gardens.

Michaux State Forest was formed as a direct result of the depletion of the forests of Pennsylvania that took place during the mid-to-late 19th century. Conservationists such as Joseph Rothrock became concerned that the forests would not regrow if they were not managed properly. Lumber and iron companies had harvested the old-growth forests for various reasons. They clear cut the forests and left behind nothing but dried tree tops and rotting stumps. The sparks of passing steam locomotives ignited wildfires that prevented the formation of second growth forests. The conservationists feared that the forest would never regrow if there was not a change in the philosophy of forest management. They called for the state to purchase land from the lumber and iron companies and the lumber and iron companies were more than willing to sell their land since that had depleted the natural resources of the forests. The changes began to take place in 1895 when Rothrock was appointed the first commissioner of the Pennsylvania Department of Forests and Waters, the forerunner of today's Pennsylvania Department of Conservation and Natural Resources. The Pennsylvania General Assembly passed a piece of legislation in 1897 that authorized the purchase of "unseated lands for forest reservations." This was the beginning of the State Forest system.

The land that is now Michaux State Forest was once owned by several large iron companies. The iron companies used the old growth forests of South Central Pennsylvania to fire their iron furnaces such as Pine Grove Furnace, Caledonia, and Mont Alto. Colliers gathered the wood and created charcoal by slowly burning the logs in massive charcoal kilns that dotted the landscape of what is now Michaux State Forest.

Michaux State Forest is the location of several "firsts" in Pennsylvania Forestry. The first state nursery was established at Mont Alto in 1902. Rothrock opened the first forestry school in Pennsylvania and the second in the United States at what is now Penn State Mont Alto. Ralph E. Brock, the first academically trained African American forester in the United States, supervised the seed nursery at the state forest from 1906 to 1911. Michaux State Forest saw the first wooden fire tower in 1905 as well as the first steel fire tower in 1914.

Michaux State Forest is now a thriving second growth forest. It is open to recreational hunting, fishing, hiking and mountain biking. It is crossed by the Appalachian Trail. Remnants of the charcoal days can still be seen in the state forest as the land where the kilns burned for so many years has yet to fully recover. Visitors to the park will notice these areas as large grassy meadows that are surrounded by the woods of Michaux State Forest.

Neighboring state forest districts
The U.S. state of Maryland is to the south
 Tuscarora State Forest (north)
 Weiser State Forest (northeast)
 William Penn State Forest (east)
 Buchanan State Forest (west)

Nearby state parks
 Caledonia State Park
 Pine Grove Furnace State Park
 Mont Alto State Park
 Kings Gap Environmental Education and Training Center

The Appalachian Trail also runs through Michaux State Forest.

References

 Note: As of July 2006, this web page has not been updated to reflect the Pennsylvania State Forest Districts realignment.
 Note: Map showing districts after the July 1, 2005 realignment

External links

Pennsylvania state forests
Protected areas of Adams County, Pennsylvania
Protected areas of Cumberland County, Pennsylvania
Protected areas of Franklin County, Pennsylvania
Blue Ridge Mountains
South Mountain Range (Maryland−Pennsylvania)
History of forestry in the United States